Leonard Brook is a  long first-order tributary to Tunungwant Creek.

Course

Watershed

See also 
 List of rivers of New York

References

Rivers of New York (state)
Tributaries of the Allegheny River
Rivers of Cattaraugus County, New York